Potassium selenate, is an odorless, white solid that forms as the potassium salt of selenic acid.

Preparation 
Potassium selenate is produced by the reaction of selenium trioxide and potassium hydroxide.

Alternatively, it can be made by treating selenous acid with potassium hydroxide, followed by oxidization of the resulting potassium selenite with bromine water.

Uses
Potassium selenate can be used to produce selenium trioxide. It can also use to treat selenium deficiency in livestock.

References 

Potassium compounds
Selenates